Brikhesh Chandra Lal  is a Nepali politician belonging to Terai Madhesh Loktantrik Party. He is also a former member of Rastriya Sabha and was elected under open category.

He is the founding leader of Terai Madhesh Loktantrik Party.

Political life 
Lal is former mayor of Janakpur. He's one of those who left Nepali Congress in the year 2007 along with Mahantha Thakur to form regional party named Terai Madhesh Loktantrik Party.

He refounded the party in the year deciding the Loktantrik Samajwadi Party, Nepal 2022 citing that both People's Socialist Party, Nepal and Loktantrik Samajwadi Party, Nepal had been ungenerous and authoritarian while going against the mandate of Madhesh Movement.

See also 
 Terai Madhesh Loktantrik Party
 Bijay Kumar Singh

References 

People from Dhanusha District
Terai Madhesh Loktantrik Party politicians
Nepali Congress politicians from Madhesh Province
Year of birth missing (living people)
Living people
Members of the National Assembly (Nepal)